Phoxinellus alepidotus is a species of ray-finned fish in the family Cyprinidae.
It is found in Bosnia and Herzegovina and Croatia.
Its natural habitats are rivers and inland karsts.
It is threatened by habitat loss.

References

Phoxinellus
Fish described in 1843
Taxonomy articles created by Polbot
Endemic fauna of Bosnia and Herzegovina
Endemic fauna of the Balkans
Freshwater fish of Europe
Endemic fish of the Neretva basin